The 2002–03 Mid-American Conference men's basketball season began with practices in October 2002, followed by the start of the 2002–03 NCAA Division I men's basketball season in November. Conference play began in January 2003 and concluded in March 2003. Central Michigan won the regular season title with a conference record of 14–4 by two games over second-place Kent State. Central Michigan defeated Kent State in the MAC tournament final and represented the MAC in the NCAA tournament. There they defeated Creighton in the first round before losing to Duke.

Preseason awards
The preseason poll was announced by the league office on October 24, 2002.

Preseason men's basketball poll
(First place votes in parenthesis)

East Division
 Ohio (22) 199
  (5) 166
  (7) 155
  (1) 94
  (1) 89
  58

West Division
  (33) 249
  191
  (3) 155
  126
  117
 Central Michigan 113
 Eastern Michigan 50

Honors

Postseason

Mid–American Tournament

NCAA tournament

Postseason awards

Coach of the Year: Jay Smith, Central Michigan
Player of the Year: Chris Kaman, Central Michigan
Freshman of the Year: Sammy Villegas, Toledo
Defensive Player of the Year:  Chris Kaman, Central Michigan
Sixth Man of the Year: Whitney Robinson, Central Michigan

Honors

See also
2002–03 Mid-American Conference women's basketball season

References